Arkansas City is a town in Desha County, Arkansas, United States. The population was 366 at the 2010 census.  The town is the county seat of Desha County.  Arkansas City's historic Commercial District, located at Desoto Avenue and Sprague Street, is listed on the National Register of Historic Places.

Geography
It sits entirely in the Delta Lowlands sub-region of the Arkansas Delta.

Demographics

2020 census

As of the 2020 United States census, there were 376 people, 174 households, and 140 families residing in the city.

2000 census
As of the census of 2000, there were 589 people, 231 households, and 161 families residing in the town. The racial makeup of the town was 55.01% White, 43.80% Black or African American, and 1.19% from two or more races. 3.23% of the population were Hispanic or Latino of any race.

There were 231 households, out of which 32.9% had children under the age of 18 living with them, 45.0% were married couples living together, 17.7% had a female householder with no husband present, and 30.3% were non-families. 27.3% of all households were made up of individuals, and 11.7% had someone living alone who was 65 years of age or older.  The average household size was 2.55 and the average family size was 3.05.

In the town, the population was spread out, with 28.4% under the age of 18, 7.8% from 18 to 24, 26.0% from 25 to 44, 25.0% from 45 to 64, and 12.9% who were 65 years of age or older.  The median age was 36 years. For every 100 females, there were 82.4 males.  For every 100 females age 18 and over, there were 79.6 males.

The median income for a household in the town was $22,014, and the median income for a family was $27,500. Males had a median income of $36,250 versus $17,188 for females. The per capita income for the town was $14,523.  About 25.3% of families and 31.8% of the population were below the poverty line, including 41.6% of those under age 18 and 37.6% of those age 65 or over.

Education

The McGehee School District serves Arkansas City.

Previously the Arkansas City School District served
Arkansas City. The district had two schools, Arkansas City Elementary School and Arkansas City High School. In 2004 the Arkansas Legislature approved a law that forced school districts with fewer than 350 students apiece to consolidate with other districts. On July 1, 2004, the Arkansas City district merged into the McGehee district. After the acquisition, the McGehee district continued to operate the Arkansas City campus as a K-6 school. By October 2005 the district no longer operated the Arkansas City facility.

Notable people
John H. Johnson, founder of an international media and cosmetics empire that includes Ebony and Jet.
Robert S. Moore Jr., farmer and politician, served in the Arkansas House of Representatives from 2007 to 2013
Henry Thane, businessman and politician, served in the Arkansas Senate from 1883 to 1887

History, 1800s and 1900s
From 1879, Arkansas City grew into a thriving river city for the next forty years. It had a natural harbor for steamboats and two railways, as well as fourteen salons and three sawmills.

An opera house was moved to Arkansas City in 1891. The building was also used as an unofficial "town hall"; at other times it became a ballroom, and citizens danced to music of groups from Memphis, Tennessee. The city then had several churches and two doctors.

Until the flood of 1927, Arkansas City was an important commercial and cultural center and one of the most important ports on the Mississippi River. The flood of 1927 devastated the city. More than 2,000 people had to be rescued. The harbor closed and made the railroads unnecessary. The city never fully recovered from this tragedy.

References

External links

 ArkansasCityUSA.com

Towns in Arkansas
Towns in Desha County, Arkansas
County seats in Arkansas
Buildings and structures in Desha County, Arkansas
Arkansas populated places on the Mississippi River